Sivan is a 1999 Indian Tamil-language science fiction action film directed by Velu Prabhakaran. The film stars Arun Pandian, Napoleon, Raadhika, Swathi and Ahana. It was released on 26 November 1999. The film is heavily inspired by the film RoboCop.

Plot

The film starts with a terrorist group entering in an Indian military ammunition depot based in Delhi. They kill all the guards and try to steal the nuclear weapons in the depot, but the terrorist group accidentally drops one of the weapons causing a chemical attack. The number of terrorist attacks resulting in India has increased over the last few months. In the context of the fight against terrorism, the Government suspects that the terrorist group is from Tamil Nadu. Alex (Arun Pandian), who is an honest police sub-inspector of Chennai, is charged to dismantle the terrorist infrastructure. Alex is happily married to a lovely wife, Ahana (Ahana) and lived with his baby girl and mother.

Meanwhile, Murugan (Napoleon) is a poor car mechanic living with his mother and beloved sister Meenakshi. His cousin Shenbagam is in love with him, but Murugan doesn't want to get married until his sister will finish her studies and will get married. One day, Alex's police car breaks down in a lost corner. Murugan, who is just passing by, helps Alex to repair his car. When Alex pays Murugan for his work, Murugan refuses to take the money because he respects the police department who works hard for the people and the nation. So Alex gives his visiting card if he will need help in the near future.

One day, Alex arrests a terrorist who had gunpowder in his car. That night, the terrorist leader threatens him over the phone, but Alex refuses to drop the case and vows to arrest him. Soon, Alex suspects Jupiter (Naga Kannan), who is a wealthy, philanthropist and respected man in the society, to be the leader of the terrorist group. Alex decides to sneak into Jupiter's warehouse alone. In the meantime, Alex's family is killed by the Jupiter's henchmen. In the warehouse, Alex is caught by Jupiter and Alex's best friend, who betrays him, the terrorists torture Alex, brutally gunning him down before Jupiter personally executes him.

Sivagami (Raadhika), an honest police sub-inspector and Alex's ex-partner, decides to take charge of the case. Meanwhile, scientists who succeeded in resurrecting death animals, decides to resurrect Alex. They exhume Alex's body, replace most of his body with cybernetics, leaving his human brain, and he becomes Sivan. Later, Murugan's sister was gang-raped and killed, Murugan's mother dies of a heart attack after hearing that news. Murugan finally tracks the gang members down and kills them all except the gang leader Uday (Uday Prakash) who managed to escape. Sivan, assigned to Alex's former city, proceeds to efficiently rid the streets of crime. When Sivagami talks to him, Sivan recognizes her, but there's not one trace of emotions in him. One day, Murugan begs Alex to punish the person who raped his sister, but Alex doesn't recognize him.

Later, Murugan kills Uday, who was, in fact, part of Jupiter's terrorist group. Uday's friend then kills his lover, and Murugan kills him in return. Sivan finally discovers his true identity and goes to Jupiter's warehouse to kill all the terrorists. Murugan decides to assist Sivan for this mission, and Sivan finally executes Jupiter.

Cast

Arun Pandian as Alex / Sivan
Napoleon as Murugan
Raadhika as Sivagami
Swathi as Shenbagam
Ahana as Ahana, Alex's wife
Naga Kannan as Jupiter
Kalpana as Meenakshi, Murugan's sister
Dubbing Janaki as Murugan's mother
Padmini
Pattinapakkam Jayaram as Terrorist
Rajkumar as Terrorist
Kishore as Terrorist
Kundrathur Babu as Terrorist
Idichapuli Selvaraj
King Kong as Nattu
Uday Prakash as Uday
Minmini Poochigal Raju
Radha Bai
Kalyan in a special appearance
Rani in a special appearance
Alphonsa in a special appearance

Soundtrack

The film score and the soundtrack were composed by Adithyan. The soundtrack, released in 1999, features 5 tracks with lyrics written by Vaali and Vaasan.

References

1999 films
1990s science fiction action films
Indian science fiction action films
1990s Tamil-language films
Cyborg films
Indian films about revenge
Fiction about memory erasure and alteration
Prosthetics in fiction
Films directed by Velu Prabhakaran